"I Feel a Song (In My Heart)" is a song written by Tony Camillo and Mary Sawyer. The song was originally recorded by Sandra Richardson in 1971

Gladys Knight & the Pips recording
In 1974, the song was recorded by Gladys Knight & the Pips and was from the album I Feel a Song.   The single spent two weeks at number one on the Hot Soul Singles chart in late 1974.  It also peaked at number 21 on the Billboard Hot 100 singles chart. The original version of this song was recorded. The version by Gladys Knight and the Pips, which was faithful to the original interpretation, was therefore the fourth outing for the song.

Chart positions

Other recordings
The song was subsequently by Linda Carr as well as the Stairsteps (whose lyrics were more spiritual), all of whom, like Gladys Knight, recorded for the Buddah label,

Samples
"I Feel a Song (In My Heart)" was later sampled by Darkchild for Megan Rochell's song "Heartbreak".
The song was also sampled for Cassius’ 2010 single “I <3 U So”, which would later be sampled for Jay-Z and Kanye West's single "Why I Love You".

References

External links
[ Song Review] on Allmusic

1974 singles
Gladys Knight & the Pips songs
1974 songs
Buddah Records singles
Songs written by Tony Camillo